Tolpia sikkimi is a moth of the family Erebidae first described by Michael Fibiger in 2007. It is known from Sikkim, India.

The wingspan is about 14 mm. The hindwing is blackish brown and the underside unicolorous brown.

References

Micronoctuini
Taxa named by Michael Fibiger
Moths described in 2007